Khlong Ton Sai is a khwaeng (subdistrict) of Khlong San District, in Bangkok, Thailand. In 2020, it had a total population of 18,704 people.

References

Subdistricts of Bangkok
Khlong San district